Medchal is a Outer Suburb of Hyderabad in the Medchal–Malkajgiri district of the Indian state of Telangana. It is the mandal headquarters of Medchal mandal in Keesara revenue division of the district. It also forms a part of Hyderabad Metropolitan Development Authority. Chamakura Malla Reddy is the MLA of Medchal Assembly Constituency.

History 
This is a industrially developed area. Medchal was previously known as Medichelama (Medi means Fig and Chelama means spring) and was later renamed as Medchal, which means town of glory. Medchal was once resort for Nizams, who constructed a beautiful mansion here. 
Jain temple of Vardhaman Mahavir which is india's third most famous temple for Jains is located in Medchal. There are many dhabas, grape gardens and beautiful villas on Medchal highway.

Medchal Municipality constituted vide G.O.Ms.No.106 MA & UD (Elec-I) Dept. dated 22-03-2013 duly merging two Gram Panchayats viz., Medchal and Athvelly. The Nagar Panchayat administration is functioning w.e.f. 16.09.2013. The area of the Nagar Panchayat is 26.95 Sq. Kms.
Medchal town is located at 17.6297 N 78.4814 E. It has an average elevation of
577 meters (1896 feet).

Geography 

Government and politics 
The Medchal municipality is the local self government of the town.

Public transport 
There is a railway station in Medchal under South Central Railway, Indian Railways.
Medchal also has a bus station, which is the second richest in Telangana in terms of revenue, according to 2016 report.

Important Places 
ISKCON runs a temple of Krishna and his older brother Balarama in the Dabilpur village, near Medchal which is visited annually by thousands of devotees.

The campus also has a Goshala with 150 cows along with a practice of organic farming.

Notable people 

 Sandeep Reddy - Telangana state first MBC Corporation chairman

References 

Cities and towns in Medchal–Malkajgiri district